Pottstown Senior High School is a high school in Pottstown, Pennsylvania, United States. It is part of the Pottstown School District. The school's mascot is a Trojan. The students go by the name of the "Trojans". The school colors are navy blue and white.

Extracurriculars

Student organizations
Art Club
Stage Crew
Key Club
Spanish Club
Student Ambassadors
Peer Mediation

Musical organizations
Marching Band
Show Choir Bell Choir
Mixed Ensemble
Tri-County Honors Choir

Service clubs and organizations
HOSA (Health Occupations Society of America) 
FCCLA (Family Career and Community Leaders of America)
DECA (An Association of Marketing Students)
Student Government

Skills USA achievement organizations
National Honor Society
National Technical Honor Society
Reading Olympics

Literary organizations
Troiad Yearbook

Athletics
Pottstown Senior High School competes in the Pioneer Athletic League (PAC-10).

Sports offered are:

Fall sports
Football
Field Hockey
Girls’ tennis
Soccer (boys' and girls')
Golf
Cross country
Cheerleading

Winter sports
Basketball (boys' and girls')
Cheerleading
Wrestling

Spring sports
Baseball
Softball
Lacrosse
Boys’ Tennis
Track (boys’ and Girls’)

See also
Pottstown School District
Pottsgrove High School

References

External links
Pottstown School District website

Public high schools in Pennsylvania
Schools in Montgomery County, Pennsylvania